Eloy Arturo Jiménez Solano (born November 27, 1996) is a Dominican professional baseball outfielder for the Chicago White Sox of Major League Baseball (MLB).

Career

Chicago Cubs
Jiménez was considered the top international free agent for 2013. MLB.com called him as a five-tool player, noting that during workouts he impressed scouts with his intelligence, speed, and gap-to-gap power.  He signed with the Chicago Cubs in July 2013 for a $2.8 million signing bonus.

Jiménez made his professional debut in 2014 with the Arizona League Cubs, where he was limited to just 164 plate appearances due to a shoulder injury. When healthy, he reached base at a disappointing .268 clip. Still, scouts remained optimistic due to his young age and physical ability. Jiménez received a promotion to short-season single-A to start 2015 with the Eugene Emeralds.  There, Jiménez fared considerably better, improving his on-base percentage to .328, and slugging seven home runs in 250 plate appearances.

Jiménez began the 2016 season with the low-A South Bend Cubs. Jiménez spent all of 2016 with South Bend, hitting .329 with 14 home runs and 81 RBIs in 112 games. After the season, the Cubs assigned Jiménez to the Mesa Solar Sox of the Arizona Fall League. Jiménez began the 2017 season with the Myrtle Beach Pelicans of the Class A-Advanced Carolina League.

Chicago White Sox
On July 13, 2017, the Cubs traded Jiménez, Dylan Cease, Matt Rose, and Bryant Flete to the Chicago White Sox for José Quintana. The White Sox assigned him to the Winston-Salem Dash of the Carolina League, and later promoted him to the Birmingham Barons of the Class AA Southern League. In 89 total games between Myrtle Beach, Winston-Salem and Birmingham, he batted .312 with 19 home runs, 65 RBIs, and a .947 OPS. The White Sox added Jiménez to their 40-man roster after the 2017 season.

In 2018, the White Sox assigned Jiménez to the Birmingham Barons of the Class AA Southern League, though he missed the end of spring training with a knee injury and the beginning of the regular season with a pectoral injury. The White Sox promoted him to the Charlotte Knights of the Class AAA International League in June. In 108 total games between the two teams, he slashed .337/.384/.577 with 22 home runs and 75 RBIs.

On March 22, 2019 Jimenez signed a six-year $43 million contract with Chicago White Sox. The deal included two additional option years for the team which could bring the total value to $75 million. It was the richest contract ever for a player with no service time before his major-league debut.

Jiménez was promoted to the White Sox 25-man roster for the 2019 season. On April 12, Jimenez hit his first two Major League Home Runs off of New York Yankees pitchers Jonathan Holder and Chad Green. He was placed on the injured list on April 29 with an ankle injury. On June 18, 2019, Jiménez hit a go ahead two run Home Run against his former team, the Chicago Cubs, off of Pedro Strop to give the White Sox a 3-1 win. Overall in 2019, Jiménez appeared in 122 games hitting .267 with 31 Home Runs and 79 RBIs. On defense in 2019, he had a -11 Defensive Runs Saved (DRS) rating, the lowest in the major leagues among left fielders. He ended the season with 31 home runs and 79 RBI in 122 games. Eloy placed 4th in Rookie of the Year voting.

In 2020, Jiménez batted .296 with fourteen home runs and 41 RBIs in 55 games. He won his first Silver Slugger Award that season.

On March 24, 2021 Jiménez ruptured his left pectoral tendon while trying to rob Oakland Athletics catcher Sean Murphy of a home run during a spring training game. The injury required surgery, and he was expected to miss five to six months. On April 1, Jiménez was placed on the 60-day injured list. On July 26, Jiménez was activated off of the injured list to make his season debut. The following day on July 27, Jimenez hit a go ahead three run homerun in the 8th inning off of Kyle Zimmer to give the White Sox a 5-3 win. His homerun was measured at 459 feet. On August 8 and 9, Jiménez became the first player in White Sox history to hit 2 Home Runs and 5 RBI's in back-to-back games. His two home runs on August 8 came off of Chicago Cubs pitchers Zach Davies and Michael Rucker and his two homers on August 9 came off of Minnesota Twins pitcher Beau Burrows. On September 7 in a game against the Oakland Athletics at the Oakland Coliseum, Jimenez was hit in the knee in the dugout by a foul ball that was hit off of his teammate Andrew Vaughn. Jimenez left the game with a significant bone bruise. In 2021, Jimenez hit .249 in 55 games with 10 Home Runs and 37 RBI's

In a series against the Twins on April 23, 2022, Jimenez suffered a Hamstring strain while attempting to beat a throw to first base and was ruled out for 6–8 weeks. On July 6, Jimenez was activated off the IL and homered in his 2nd at bat. Overall in 2022, Jimenez appeared in 84 games hitting .295 while hitting 16 Home Runs and 54 RBIs.

References

External links

1996 births
Arizona League Cubs players
Birmingham Barons players
Charlotte Knights players
Chicago White Sox players
Dominican Republic expatriate baseball players in the United States
Eugene Emeralds players
Gigantes del Cibao players
Living people
Major League Baseball outfielders
Major League Baseball players from the Dominican Republic
Mesa Solar Sox players
Myrtle Beach Pelicans players
Silver Slugger Award winners
South Bend Cubs players
Sportspeople from Santo Domingo
Winston-Salem Dash players
2023 World Baseball Classic players